The Regional State Archives in Oslo is a regional state archives situated at Sognsvann in Oslo, Norway. Part of the National Archival Services of Norway, it is responsible for archiving documents from state institutions in the counties of Akershus, Oslo and Østfold. The facility is jointly located with the National Archives of Norway. The collection includes 19.2 shelf-kilometers of material.

The agency was created in 1914 as the Regional State Archives in Kristiania, and initially covered all of Eastern Norway and Agder. From 13 July 1917 the newly created Regional State Archives in Hamar took over documents from Oppland and Hedmark. The current name was adopted in 1924. With the opening of the Regional State Archives in Kristiansand in 1934, documents from Agder was moved there. The final demerger took place in 1994, when the Regional State Archives in Kongsberg took over documents from Buskerud, Telemark and Vestfold.

References

National Archival Services of Norway
Organisations based in Oslo
1914 establishments in Norway
Government agencies established in 1914